Mickey Hays (June 30, 1972 – June 30, 1992) was an American actor with progeria, a rare genetic condition whose symptoms resemble accelerated aging. He starred in the 1986 Weird Western science fiction film The Aurora Encounter, where he portrayed an alien who visits Earth. After the filming, Hays remained close friends with fellow cast member Jack Elam and appeared in the 1987 documentary about congenital conditions I Am Not a Freak. He died on his 20th birthday.

References

Further reading 
Ramstad, Evan. "15-Year-Old Doesn't Let Aging Disease Slow Him Down". Houston Chronicle, March 14, 1988.
Feldman, Claudia. "Aging in Overdrive: Now 17, Mickey Hays Drives a Truck, Inspires Other Kids and Worries about a Dear Friend". Houston Chronicle, July 23, 1989.
Feldman, Claudia. "The Aging of Mickey Hays". Houston Chronicle, May 31, 1992.
Feldman, Claudia. "'He Crammed 60 Years of Living in 20': Progeria Victim Mickey Hays Dies". Houston Chronicle, July 2, 1992.
"Texan with Aging Disorder Dies at 20." San Antonio Express-News, July 2, 1992.
"Funeral is Held for Mickey Hays." Houston Chronicle, July 4, 1992.

20th-century American male actors
People with progeria
1972 births
1992 deaths
American male film actors
People from Longview, Texas
Male actors from Texas
Actors with disabilities